Something pleasant may have associations with happiness, entertainment, enjoyment, ecstasy, or euphoria.

Pleasant may also refer to:

Pleasant, Indiana, an unincorporated community
Skulduggery Pleasant, the main character in the eponymous book series by Derek Landy

People with the given name Pleasant:

 Pleasant B. Tully (1829-1897), American politician
 Pleasant Crump (1847-1951), American centenarian
 Pleasant Gehman (21st century), American journalist
 Pleasant Daniel Gold (1833–1920), American publisher and clergyman
 Pleasant M. Armstrong (1810-1853), American ship builder
 Pleasant Moorman Miller (died 1849), American politician
 Pleasant Porter (1840-1907), American Indian statesman
 Pleasant Rowland (born circa 1941), American educator, writer, and entrepreneur
 Pleasant T. Chapman (1854-1931), American politician
 Pleasant Tackitt (1803-1886), American Christian missionary
 Robert Pleasant Trippe (1819-1900), American politician
 Thomas Pleasant Dockery (1833-1898), Confederate Army general

People with the surname Pleasant:

 Anthony Pleasant (born 1968), American football player
 Frank Mount Pleasant (1884-1937), American track and field athlete
 Frank Pleasant (21st century), American football coach
 Mary Ellen Pleasant (died 1904), American abolitionist
 Ray Pleasant (1928-2022), American politician
 Reggie Pleasant (born 1962), American football player
 Ruffin Pleasant (1871-1937), American politician
 Wally Pleasant (21st century), American musician

See also